Michael Wells is the president of the European Society of Pathology.

Early life and education
Michael Wells graduated in 1976 from the University of Manchester with a BSc and MB, ChB in medicine and surgery.

Career 
After graduation, he moved to Bristol and then later to the University of Leeds where he was a Lecturer in the then Department of Pathology.  In 1997, he was appointed Professor of Gynaecological Pathology at the University of Sheffield.  During his career, he has served as the president of the International Society of Gynecological Pathologists and also as the president of British Gynecological Cancer Society.

Books 
 Editor of Haines and Taylor Obstetrical & Gynaecological Pathology
 Editor of the journal Histopathology

Personal
Wells is married to Lynne, a nurse specialist in palliative care and has a son, a daughter and two stepsons.

References

Living people
Academics of the University of Sheffield
British medical researchers
British pathologists
21st-century British medical doctors
1952 births
Alumni of the University of Manchester
Academics of the University of Leeds